Monument of Metal is a 2011 compilation album by Canadian heavy metal band Anvil.

Album artwork 
The artwork for this compilation album features an enormous statue of an anvil in a park courtyard bordered with Canadian flags. Inside the courtyard can be seen tiny silhouettes of people, which helps give the actual monument its scale. The concept was taken from an original painting done by drummer, Robb Reiner, the only real difference being that the album cover features a very warm cloud laced sky where the original featured a clear blue sky. The original artwork can be seen hanging in Reiner's basement on the acclaimed rock documentary, Anvil! The Story of Anvil.

Track listing

Personnel 
 Lips – vocals & guitar (all tracks)
 Robb Reiner – drums (all tracks)
 Ivan Hurd – guitar (tracks 8, 13, 15, 16)
 Glenn Gyorffy – bass (tracks 1, 2, 3, 4, 5, 12, 13, 15, 16, 17, 19)
 Dave "Squirrely" Allison – guitar (tracks 6, 7, 9, 11, 14, 18)
 Ian "Dix" Dickson – bass (tracks 6, 7, 9, 10, 11, 14, 18)
 Sebastian Marino – guitar (track 10)

References 

2011 compilation albums
Anvil (band) albums
The End Records albums